Orthotylus troodensis is a species of bug from a family of Miridae that is endemic to Cyprus.

References

Insects described in 1961
Endemic arthropods of Cyprus
Hemiptera of Europe
troodensis